

The CAC K100 is a mini-UAV developed in France in the 1990s. The company sells a reconnaissance variant, the K100/R, and an antiradar loitering attack variant, the K100/A. The K100 is of conventional aircraft configuration, except for an upright vee tail and a pusher propeller. It has no landing gear.

Specifications

References
This article contains material that originally came from the web article Unmanned Aerial Vehicles by Greg Goebel, which exists in the Public Domain.

1990s French military reconnaissance aircraft
Unmanned aerial vehicles of France
K100